The Mother and Baby Homes Commission of Investigation (officially the Commission of Investigation into Mother and Baby Homes and certain related matters) was a judicial commission of investigation, established in 2015 by the Irish government to investigate mother and baby homes—institutions, most run by Catholic religious nuns, where unwed women were sent to deliver their babies. It was set up following statements that the bodies of up to 800 babies and children may have been interred in an unmarked mass grave in the Bon Secours Mother and Baby Home, located in Tuam, County Galway. Its remit additionally covered investigation into the records of and the practices at an additional thirteen Mother and Baby Homes. The members of the three-person Commission were Judge Yvonne Murphy (chairperson), Dr William Duncan and Professor Mary E. Daly.

Originally scheduled to issue its final report by February 2018, the Commission was granted a series of extensions. In January 2021, the final report detailed that around 9,000 children, one in seven of those born in the 18 institutions covered by the Commission's terms of reference, had died in them between 1922 and 1998, double the rate of infant mortality in the general population. The final report was published on 12 January. On 13 January 2021, Taoiseach Micheál Martin made a formal apology to survivors on behalf of the state. The Commission was subsequently dissolved on 28 February 2021.

Background
Amateur historian Catherine Corless conducted research into babies born at the Bon Secours Mother and Baby Home in her hometown of Tuam, Galway. She collected data for several years, and published several articles in local newspapers in 2010, 2013, and 2014.  Her research suggested that the bodies of 796 babies and children may have been interred in an unrecorded mass grave at the Tuam Baby Home.   Her research was brought to the attention of Alison O'Reilly, a reporter at the Irish Mail on Sunday. O'Reilly wrote an article on the subject in 2014, which garnered widespread international attention. Following the article, there were calls for an investigation of the site and for an inquiry into all such institutions.

Establishment
On 4 June 2014, the Irish government announced it was bringing together representatives from multiple government departments to investigate the deaths at the Bon Secours home and to propose how to address the issue. The Minister for Children and Youth Affairs, Charlie Flanagan, said any government inquiry would not be confined to the home in Tuam and that officials would advise the Government on the best form of inquiry before the end of June 2014.
On 16 July 2014, the government announced that Judge Yvonne Murphy would chair a Commission of Investigation into Mother and Baby homes, including Tuam. In October 2014, the Minister for Children and Youth Affairs, James Reilly, announced that the draft terms of reference for the inquiry had been circulated to government departments for comment.

The three-person Commission comprises Judge Yvonne Murphy as Chairperson, with an international legal expert on child protection and adoption, Dr William Duncan, and historian Professor Mary E. Daly, appointed as Commissioners.

Terms of Reference
The Terms of Reference specified for the Commission are to investigate and report on:

The circumstances for the entry of single women into Mother and Baby Homes and the exit pathways on leaving, including the extent of their participation in relevant decisions;
The living conditions and care arrangements experienced by residents during their period of accommodation, including by reference to the literature on the living conditions and care experienced by mothers and children generally during the period;
Mortality among mothers and children residing in the institutions (to determine the general causes, circumstances, and rates of mortality), compared to mortality among women and children generally;
Post-mortem practices and procedures in respect of children or mothers who died while resident, including the reporting of deaths, burial arrangements, and transfer of remains to educational institutions for the purpose of the anatomical examination;
The extent of compliance with relevant regulatory and ethical standards of the time of systemic vaccine trials found by the Commission to have been conducted on children resident in one or more of the institutions (including, inter alia, vaccine trials conducted using vaccines manufactured by Burroughs Welcome  in 1960/61, 1970 or 1973);
Arrangements for the entry of children into the institutions in circumstances when their mother was not also resident at the time of their entry;
For children who did not remain in the care of their parents, to examine exit pathways on leaving the institutions so as to establish patterns of the referral or relevant relationships with other entities, and in particular to identify:
the extent to which the child's welfare and protection were considered in practices relating to their placement in Ireland or abroad;
the extent of participation of mothers in relevant decisions, including
the procedures that were in place to obtain consent from mothers in respect of adoption, and
whether these procedures were adequate for the purpose of ensuring such consent was full, free and informed; and
the practices and procedures for placement of children where there was cooperation with another person or persons in arranging this placement, including where an intermediary organisation arranged a subsequent placement;
To identify the extent to which any group of residents may have systematically been treated differently on any grounds (religion, race, Traveller identity, or disability).

The investigation covers the period from 1922 (the foundation of the state) to 1998.

Institutions included
The Terms of Reference specified that only 14 named mother and baby homes were to be included within the scope of the investigation. These were:
 Ard Mhuire, Dunboyne, Co. Meath;
 Belmont (Flatlets), Belmont Ave, Dublin 4;
 Bessboro House, Blackrock, Cork;
 Bethany Home, originally Blackhall Place, Dublin 7 and from 1934, Orwell Road, Rathgar, Dublin 6;
 Bon Secours Mother and Baby Home, Tuam, Co. Galway;
 Denny House, Eglinton Rd, Dublin 4, originally Magdalen Home, 8 Lower Leeson St, Dublin 2;
 Kilrush, Cooraclare Rd, Co. Clare;
 Manor House, Castlepollard, Co. Westmeath;
 Ms. Carr’s (Flatlets), 16 Northbrook Rd, Dublin 6;
 Regina Coeli Hostel, North Brunswick Street, Dublin 7;
 Sean Ross Abbey, Roscrea, Co. Tipperary;
 St. Gerard’s, originally 39, Mountjoy Square, Dublin 1;
 St Patrick's Mother and Baby Home, Navan Road, Dublin 7, originally known as Pelletstown, and subsequent transfer to Eglinton House, Eglinton Rd, Dublin 4; and
 The Castle, Newtowncunningham, Co. Donegal.

In addition, a "representative sample" of state-operated County Homes, selected by the Commission as fulfilling a function similar to the Mother and Baby Homes, are included. These are:
 St Kevin's Institution (Dublin Union)
 Stranorlar County Home, Co Donegal (St Joseph's)
 Cork City County Home (St Finbarr's)
 Thomastown County Home, Co Kilkenny (St Columba's)

Several of the named homes – principally Bessboro House (Cork), Bon Secours (Galway), Manor House (Westmeath), Sean Ross Abbey (Tipperary) and St. Patrick's (Dublin) – had previously been highlighted as sources for illegal domestic and foreign adoptions, with many of the children being trafficked to the United States.

Methodology
In tandem with carrying out the investigations outlined in the Terms of Reference, the  Commission was also empowered to establish a "Confidential Committee", with the aim of providing a forum for former residents and staff of the named institutions to provide accounts of their experiences.  Such accounts may be used to inform relevant investigations, and the Confidential Committee is to publish a report on the accounts received.

The Commission also includes a literature-based academic social history module, in order to establish an objective and comprehensive historical analysis of significant relevant matters. The Commission is to rely on this analysis as evidence to inform its investigations and to assist it in framing its findings and conclusions within the wider social and historical context of the relevant period under investigation.

Bon Secours Mother and Baby Home

The Commission was brought into being following extensive worldwide media coverage of statements that the remains of up to 800 children had been interred in an unmarked mass grave, believed to be a disused septic tank, on the grounds of the Bon Secours Mother and Baby Home in Tuam, County Galway.  In 2014, a local historian, Catherine Corless, had published an article documenting the deaths of 796 babies and toddlers at the Home during its decades of operation. There were death certificates for 796 infants, but no burial records, which raised fears of a mass grave. The report said that the most commonly recorded causes of death among the infants were congenital debilities, infectious diseases and malnutrition. The article said that the bodies were buried in a site at the Home and that there was a high death rate of its residents. Her research led her to conclude that almost all had been buried in an unmarked and unregistered site at the Home, with Corless believing that the site was also the location of a septic tank when overlaid with maps of the period of use as a workhouse.

The Irish government came under pressure to launch an investigation, which eventually resulted in the establishment of the Commission in February 2015.

Excavations
As part of its investigations, the Commission ordered excavations of the suspected burial site in Tuam to be carried out.  On 3 March 2017, the Commission announced that multiple human remains had been found during excavations carried out between November 2016 and February 2017 at the site. Tests conducted on some of the remains indicated they had been aged between 35 foetal weeks and 2–3 years.  The announcement confirmed that the deceased died during the period of time that the property was used by the Mother and Baby Home, not from an earlier period, as most of the bodies dated from the 1920s to the 1950s.  The remains were found in an "underground structure divided into 20 chambers."  The Commission said "it had not yet determined what the purpose of this structure was but it appeared to be a sewage tank. The commission had also not yet determined if it was ever used for this purpose."

The Commission stated that it was continuing its investigation into who was responsible for the disposal of human remains in this way, and that it had notified the coroner.

Reactions to excavation find
In 2017 Minister for Children and Youth Affairs Katherine Zappone said that the coroner's results would determine the direction of the investigation and that the Commission would determine whether other sites needed to be excavated, including another part of the Tuam site.

The Adoption Rights Alliance and Justice for Magdalenes Research campaign groups demanded that Zappone publish a five-month-old report from the Commission on the issue of broadening the probe's terms of reference beyond the original 18 institutions included, and said the state must ensure that all human remains buried in unmarked graves at institutions in Ireland are identified. (The report was published in April 2017; the delay, according to the Department of Children and Youth Affairs, was due to the report being referred to the Attorney General for advice on the report's recommendations on the issue of redress.)

Taoiseach Enda Kenny described the find as "truly appalling", saying "the babies of single mothers involved had been treated like some kind of sub-species." He commended the work of Catherine Corless in bringing the issue to light. Speaking on the find in Dáil Éireann, in response to requests to widen the terms of reference of the Commission, he described the Mother and Baby Home as "a chamber of horrors."

In the same debate, Bríd Smith, AAA-PBP TD, called for the Bon Secours order of nuns to be disbanded. She said, "its hospital empire, the biggest private hospital group in the State, was built on the bones of the dead Tuam babies".  Smith said "everyone was not responsible for what happened in Tuam. It was paid for by the state, which knew exactly what was going on, and there were 'headage payments' of up to US$3,000 for each child sent to the United States."

The Taoiseach's speech was criticised in the Dáil, when Catherine Connolly directly addressed the speech, stating:

Leader of Fianna Fáil, Micheál Martin T.D., called for a state apology for the infants, a commemoration to be held for them, and for the expansion of the Commission of Inquiry to include other institutions and sites.

The Minister for Justice, Frances Fitzgerald, stated that "the discovery is an infinitely sad reminder of an Ireland that was a very harsh, harsh place for women and their babies" and that "it shows the tortured relationship the State and church had with pregnant women—it is a tragedy that we are now facing in its entirety."

The Catholic Archbishop of Tuam, Michael Neary, said that he was horrified by the confirmation that significant quantities of human remains were buried on the site of a former mother and baby home in the town. Describing the news as "a body blow", he said he had been "greatly shocked to learn of the scale of the practice during the time in which the Bon Secours ran the mother and baby home in Tuam."

The Irish Catholic Bishops' Conference apologised for the hurt caused by its part in the system, which they said also involved adoptions. They also urged parishes to ensure that the burial sites of former residents were appropriately marked, and said that "the appalling story of life, death and adoptions related to the Mother and Baby Homes has shocked everyone in Ireland and beyond."

The President of Ireland, Michael D. Higgins, speaking about the find at an International Women's Day reception, said there "are dark shadows that hang over our meeting, shadows that require us all to summon up yet again a light that might dispel the darkness to which so many women and their children were condemned, and the questions left unanswered as we moved on." President Higgins described Catherine Corless' work as "another necessary step in blowing open the locked doors of a hidden Ireland."

Both TV3 and RTÉ broadcast documentaries on the scandal, with the latter's Claire Byrne Live including a segment listing the names of all 796 children who had died at the home.

Catherine Corless appeared on The Late Late Show on 10 March 2017, receiving a standing ovation at the end of the segment. Host Ryan Tubridy said "If that audience represents the people watching tonight, there is a hunger in this country for the truth."

Investigation team
In June 2017, Minister Zappone announced the appointment of a team of international experts, comprising an Irish-based forensic archaeologist, a US-based forensic anthropologist and a UK-based forensic scientist, to investigate the burial site. Zappone also said that she was considering broadening the terms of reference for the Commission, in order to "help to answer some of the questions which have been raised again in public debate."  The team is led by Dr. Niamh McCullagh, who previously worked with the Independent Commission for the Location of Victims' Remains in Northern Ireland and the Joint Prisoner of War/Missing in Action Command that aimed to locate the bodies of war dead.

Zappone stated that McCullagh will identify options for the government, looking at the possibility of exhuming the remains and identifying if there are any further remains on the site that have yet to be discovered. The team is due to complete its final report in September 2017.

In July 2017, the team conducted an extensive geophysical survey on the site. This consisted of data collection through a variety of non-invasive techniques, over the course of 5 days.  The team liaised with the Coroner for North Galway, the Garda Síochána, the National Monuments Services and Forensic Science Ireland, and advice was received from the International Committee for the Red Cross.

When Pope Francis visited Ireland in August 2018, Zappone raised the issue of the Tuam home in a meeting with him, and told him "I hope the Church will make reparation for its part in this shameful chapter,"

In October 2018 Zappone announced that the remains of children buried in unmarked graves were to be exhumed, identified forensically, and reburied respectfully. The operation would not be straightforward, and presented "unprecedented technical and legal issues".

Additional issues
On 3 June 2015, the Irish Examiner published a special report which said that the Irish Health Services Executive had voiced concerns in 2012 that up to 1,000 children may have been trafficked from the Home, and recommending that the then health minister be informed so that "a fully-fledged, fully resourced forensic investigation and State inquiry" could be launched. The issue had arisen within the HSE when a principal social worker responsible for adoption discovered "a large archive of photographs, documentation and correspondence relating to children sent for adoption to the USA" and "documentation in relation to discharges and admissions to psychiatric institutions in the Western area." The HSE said that there were letters from the Home to parents asking for money for the upkeep of their children and says that the duration of stay for children may have been prolonged by the order for financial reasons. It also uncovered letters to parents asking for money for the upkeep of some children who had already been discharged or had died. The social worker had compiled a list of "up to 1,000 names." HSE reports mentioned the possibility that children had been trafficked for adoption with one speculating that it was possible that death certificates were falsified so children could be "brokered" for adoption.

In May 2018, the Child and Family Agency (Tusla) referred 126 files to the Commission regarding births that had been falsely registered by the Saint Patrick's Guild adoption agency. In a press release, Minister Zappone said: "We have known about the practice of incorrect registrations for many years, but it has been extremely difficult to identify and prove in individual cases because of the deliberate failure of those involved to keep records. However, Tusla has found clear evidence in the case of some records previously held by St Patrick's Guild."

Criticisms during lifetime of the Commission
The scope of the Investigation and in particular its restriction to just a limited number of named homes has been criticised by, among others, the United Nations Committee on the Elimination of Discrimination Against Women (CEDAW). In a 2017 report, it stated that the Commission of Investigation "is narrow such that it does not cover all homes and analogous institutions [and] therefore may not address the whole spectrum of abuses perpetrated against women and girls."

The delay in publishing a final report and the fact that redress for victims of the homes was not considered until the final report was published was criticised by survivors, including the Coalition of Mother and Baby Home Survivors (CMABS). Paul Redmond, the chairperson of CMABS, said that many survivors are now elderly and have already died since the revelations about Tuam first emerged, and that "This is yet another delaying tactic by the Government to deny survivors truth and justice. The current inquiry is already too limited and excludes many survivors and this delay will now ensure that thousands more survivors are denied justice by death." Survivor Mary Teresa Collins and her daughter Laura Angela Collins, chairwoman of Justice 4 All Women & Children said "the government is stalling."

Reports

Commission reports
The Commission was originally due to issue a final report by February 2018, but was given a one-year extension in December 2017.  The report may include recommendations, including recommendations relating to "relevant matters that it considers may warrant further investigation in the public interest." It had been due to issue an interim report in 2016, but when published, this report consisted solely of a request for a time extension to 2018 due to the large number of people wanting to make submissions to the Confidential Committee.

A second interim report was issued to the Minister in September 2016 and was published in April 2017. The delay, according to the Department of Children and Youth Affairs, was due to the report being referred to the Attorney General for advice on the report's recommendations on the issue of redress.

A third interim report was published in December 2017. Commenting on the report and announcing the time extension for its final report, Minister Zappone said:

The third interim report reveals that legally enforceable discovery orders relating to the records of Catholic religious congregations that ran most of the homes have been issued but the Commission states that "some have very little material available while others have provided extensive material." Government Departments, local authorities and the HSE have also been issued with discovery orders.

The issues raised in the Commission's third report include:
 the time-consuming nature of investigations: "in particular, the Commission has spent considerable time trying to establish the burial practices in the mother and baby home in Tuam (Co Galway)"; and the electronic scanning of records held by the Child and Family Agency [Tusla].
 "There are significant gaps" in the material available on institutions "and further searches have to be made to try to fill these gaps. For example, the records of some of the various health authorities are proving difficult to find. It is not clear if they have been lost or destroyed or simply that no one knows where they are. This may be due to the changes in structures over the years – from local authorities/Board of Guardians/Boards of Public Assistance to Health Boards and then to the HSE and, in some cases, to the Child and Family Agency. The Commission is continuing its efforts to find this material."
 "While there are detailed death records available, there are significant gaps in the information available about the burials of babies who died in a number of the institutions under investigation. The Commission is continuing to make inquiries about burials and burial records but it appears that this is an area in which it will be difficult to establish the facts.
 "The Commission has heard evidence from 140 individuals about conditions in the institutions. These include former residents, workers and representatives of the authorities who ran the institutions. This process is not yet complete and, particularly in respect of the authorities who ran the institutions, cannot be completed until all the documentary evidence has been analysed."

In all, five interim reports were published.

Departmental reports
In July 2017, Minister Zappone announced that in addition to the Commission progressing its independent investigations, the Department of Children and Youth Affairs would separately report each month on the measures being progressed across Government to respond to the issues which have emerged so far from the work of the Commission.

The first such monthly report was published on 7 July 2017.

The second report was published on 4 August 2017.

The third report was published on 1 September 2017, and announced that the Expert Technical Group was working with, among others, the Argentine Forensic Anthropology Team, who are world leaders in humanitarian forensic action and best practices in relation to community engagement.

In total, these reports indicate that there were 56,000 women, as young as 12 years old, in these homes and some 57,000 babies were born; 15% of the mothers and/or babies died as a result of malnutrition or preventable illness. Surviving mothers were often separated from their babies, who were put up for adoption without maternal consent. Several of the homes were found to have conducted vaccination trials on the mothers and babies.

Expert Technical Group report
In December 2017, the Expert Technical Group reported to the Department of Children and Youth Affairs, outlining five possible courses of action on the Tuam site. These are:
 "Memorialisation: No further investigative work; Return the site to being managed as a memorial; Make site safe for public access."
 "Exhume known human remains: Recover human remains interred in the chambered structure identified to date and reinter elsewhere; No further forensic analysis of remains."
 "Forensic excavation and recovery of known human remains: Complete forensic archaeological excavation, recovery and analysis of human remains from the chambers identified to date."
 "Forensic excavation and recovery, and further evaluation/ excavation of other areas of potential burial/ interest: Complete forensic excavation and recovery of all human remains in memorial garden and any other targeted area, following geophysical survey, assessment of witness statements, historical records, etc."
 "Forensic excavation of total available area: Full forensic and archaeological excavation of all available ground formerly occupied by the M&B Home. A total of 0.4 hectares, comprising memorial garden, playground, car park etc. Excludes private built areas (houses and gardens etc. subsequently built on the former site)."

Zappone said that before any decision was taken on the option to be used, she first wanted to consult with the local community in Tuam and other affected parties, such as relatives of those who were resident in the home. She said the consultation process, which would be undertaken by Galway County Council, would take three months.

A report was published in April 2018, by Galway County Council based on qualitative and quantitative research conducted by Barbara Walshe and Catherine O'Connell.

The Tuam Home Survivors Network said its members had given careful consideration to the Expert Technical Group's report and that the only appropriate action was "a complete excavation of the Tuam site to ensure the recovery of all human remains contained there." The Network are also seeking postmortems in respect of each set of human remains and cataloguing of DNA from all remains in order to create the most complete database possible.

The Technical Group also identified a number of human rights issues which were outside its terms of reference. Zappone has appointed human rights expert and Special Rapporteur on Child Protection, Professor Geoffrey Shannon, to examine these issues and to report to her on his findings.

Final Commission report
The final report of the Commission was submitted to Roderic O'Gorman, the Minister for Children, Equality, Disability, Integration and Youth on 30 October 2020, and was published on 12 January 2021.

The final report is some 3,000 pages in length, including 1,000 pages of survivor testimony and an 'executive summary' of 200 pages. It was due to be given to survivors prior to publication, but was leaked to the Irish Independent newspaper on the weekend before, which drew strong criticism from the Minister involved, Roderic O'Gorman.

Findings of final report

Deaths
The report detailed an "appalling level of infant mortality at mother-and-baby homes," and said "in the years before 1960 mother-and-baby homes did not save the lives of 'illegitimate' children; in fact, they appear to have significantly reduced their prospects of survival." It detailed that around 9,000 children, one in seven of those born in the 18 institutions covered by the Commission's terms of reference, had died in them between 1922 and 1998, double the rate of infant mortality in the general population.

Medical experiments
The report confirmed that children had been subject to medical experiments, being used in vaccine trials without parental or guardian consent. All were carried out by either the Wellcome Foundation or Glaxo Laboratories, which have since merged to form the GlaxoSmithKline pharmaceutical company.

The trials detailed in the report include:
 1930 Trial of Wellcome anti-diphtheria vaccine on 142 children in two unidentified orphanages and to 436 children aged between eight months and 14 years among the general child population in Cork city.
 1934 Trial of Wellcome anti-diphtheria vaccine on 24 children, varying in age from seven months to 14 years, resident in the Dublin Union, later known as St Pat’s.
 1934–1936 Trial of Wellcome 'one-shot' anti-diphtheria vaccine to 250 children in an unidentified residential institution for boys and to 2,541 children among the general population in Co Cork.
 1935 Trial of Wellcome vaccine on 46 children, aged four to 15 years, resident in St Vincent’s Industrial School, Goldenbridge, St Joseph’s School for Deaf Boys, Cabra, and St Saviour’s Orphanage, Lower Dominick Street, Dublin.
 1935 Trial of Wellcome anti-diphtheria vaccine in children’s residential institutions in Tipperary, likely the three industrial schools in Tipperary South: St Bernard’s Industrial School, Fethard; St Francis’s Industrial School, Cashel; and St Joseph’s Industrial School, Ferryhouse, Clonmel.
 1960–1961 Trial of Wellcome Quadruple (4 in 1) vaccine "Quadrivax" on 58 infants and children resident in a number of institutions, including Bessborough, St Patrick’s Home, Navan Road; Dunboyne; Castlepollard; St Clare’s Home, Stamullen and Mount Carmel Industrial School, Moate.
 1964 Trial of Wellcome "Wellcovax" measles vaccine on 12 children living in Sean Ross.
 1964–1965 Trial of Glaxo Laboratories "Mevilin-L" measles vaccine on children living in Bessborough and St Patrick’s, Navan Road.
 1965 Trial of Glaxo Laboratories Quintuple (5 in 1) vaccine on children Bessborough and St Patrick’s, Navan Road.
 1968–1969 Trial of Glaxo Laboratories ‘Mevilin-L’ measles vaccine on at least 30 children resident in St Patrick’s, Navan Road.
 1968–1969 Trials of experimental replacement formula milk took place in St Patrick's Navan Road), and Bessborough.
 1970 Trial of Wellcome’s Rubella vaccine on 72 children living in the general community and 69 children aged between two and 18 years old "resident in an orphanage in a suburb of Dublin".
 1973 Trial of Wellcome’s modified DTP vaccine on 65 children in the general community and 53 children resident in St Patrick’s, Navan Road, and in three residential children’s homes.

The Commission found that the trials in seven institutions it investigated were "illegal and unethical even by the standards of the time", that trials had proceeded without being licensed, that regulatory standards had not been upheld. The report states that the trials would have been a basic breach of the Nuremberg Code, and that no consents had been obtained for children in institutions.
The report's statement that there was "no evidence of injury to the children involved as a result of the vaccines" has been disputed by survivors, who point out that they were never contacted again by the companies or scientists involved following their adoptions, and that their adoptive parents had never been aware that they had been used in the trials.

Racism
The report details that 275 children were born in or passed through the mother and baby homes under investigation. The report states that was "no evidence of discrimination" in relation to how adoptions were decided upon, nor in the testimonies of some mixed-race people who had spoken to the Commission. This is disputed by the Association of Mixed Race Irish (AMRI) and Bryan Fanning, the Professor of Migration and Social Policy at University College Dublin.

A spokesperson for AMRI, Conrad Bryan, said "On the one hand to say there was no evidence of discrimination and then to continue on and say race was taken into account in placing children — that's a very confused inconclusive statement. It just appears that the testimony we've given has basically not been believed. They relied primarily on records they discovered and checked. However, a lot of the testimony can be seen in the report and people can read and make their own judgements on it and see the extent of the racism. The commission says itself there was casual and unthinking racism, even negative bias, so they're clearly showing that racism existed. I was in Pelletstown during the 1960s and the report says virtually 100% of illegitimate children were adopted. Of the majority of the mixed-race children in Pelletstown, only 48% were adopted. Now if that isn't racism, can somebody explain to me what is racism?"

Reactions to Commission's final report
The release of the final report generated huge media interest in Ireland and abroad.  The state broadcaster, RTÉ, created a special section on its website to cover the issue, publishing over 40 news articles on the topic in the days following release.

There were mixed reactions from a variety of organisations and individuals.

Religious orders

Bon Secours Sisters
The Bon Secours Sisters, who ran the nursing home which eventually resulted in the setting up of the Commission, released an apology. It states:

The order also committed to participating in a "Restorative Recognition Scheme" to be set up to compensate survivors.

Daughters of Charity
The Daughters of Charity ran the Saint Patrick's Mother and Baby Home (also known as Pelletstown) on the Navan Road, in Dublin. They released a statement commending the report and stating that "Many of our sisters dedicated their lives to supporting these women, who arrived at the service in which the sisters were employed to have their babies in secret, with little or no support from family and wider society. We so wish and deeply regret that we could not have done more to ease the burden and suffering carried by these women, mostly alone, as they dealt with both a major crisis in their lives and totally unjustifiable rejection. Today, as this important report is published, our thoughts are for the thousands of women and children who suffered without justification or purpose in an Ireland that thankfully has changed forever."

Sisters of the Sacred Heart
The Sisters of the Sacred Hearts of Jesus and Mary ran Bessborough House in Cork. This institution had a particularly high infant mortality rate and current controversy surrounds the location of burials of children on the grounds and order's plans to have the lands developed.  They issued a statement, saying: "For our part, we want to sincerely apologise to those who did not get the care and support they needed and deserved. It is a matter of great sorrow to us that babies died while under our care. We sincerely regret that so many babies died particularly in regard to Bessborough in the 1940s. We also want to recognise the dreadful suffering and loss experienced by mothers. The burial of infants and children who died while in care has understandably become a matter of immense controversy. We are distressed and saddened that it is so difficult to prove with legal certainty where many of these infants were buried especially with regard to Bessborough. We did everything possible including the engagement of a professional historian to assist us in our dealings with the Commission on this vitally important matter."

State apology and reactions
The Taoiseach, Micheál Martin, issued a formal apology to victims and survivors on behalf of the state. He said in part:

The Taoiseach also promised that the apology would be followed by actions, including access to counselling and records, provision of medical cards, and a system of reparations.

Catherine Connolly
In a statement in the Dáil, she said "It was not the stories that upset me. It is the narrative that is being put on those stories by the powers that be. The extracts of their testimony, what jumps out is the complete absence of any knowledge on sexuality. Not to mention, sexual abuse and rape. Then you look at the conclusions drawn by the commission, and they tell us that there was no evidence that women were forced to enter mother and baby homes. That for me is extraordinary, because it bears no connection to the testimony given by the women and men that came forward, how they could have drawn that conclusion is beyond, beyond my capability." She also disagreed with the report's statement that the Commission found no evidence of forced adoption, saying "That is totally out of line with the evidence given by the women and the men."

Roderic O'Gorman
Some five days after the release of the report and as survivors reacted to its findings, Roderic O'Gorman, the Minister for Children, Equality, Disability, Integration and Youth and the official to whom the report was presented, stated that on the issue of consent to adoptions and forced adoption, the Commission had taken a narrow and very legalistic approach to the issue of consent, and that women had been left with absolutely no choice. He declined to endorse how the Commission had conducted its inquiries. O'Gorman committed to a GDPR-compliant approach to new adoption information and tracing legislation, which he promised would be enacted by the end of 2021, and to the establishment of a redress scheme. The project was stated in August 2022 to have been abandoned.

President of Ireland
The President of Ireland, Michael D. Higgins, issued a comprehensive statement, which praised the work of Catherine Corless and others in bringing issues to light and urging investigation.  His statement begins: "The Commission of Investigation's report reminds us of how far short Ireland fell of fulfilling the promise of our Republic, and of how, the violation of fundamental rights of our fellow citizens was condoned over an extended period of time. State and Church bear a heavy responsibility for this.

As President of Ireland, I welcome the publication of the Commission's Report and the apologies offered, my thoughts must be, as they have been so often before, of the mothers and of the infants who died, with those children who survived and who continue to carry the trauma of their early lives, and beyond that the burden of being deprived of information about their birth parents; of all of those women, alive and dead, who have borne the scars of their experiences, the shame and secrecy imposed upon them, and the life-long burden for so many arising from trauma, bereavement or separation from their children."

Mary McAleese
Mary McAleese, a former President of ireland, in an interview on the topic of the Commission's report on an RTÉ radio programme the weekend after publication of the report, stated: "The Church was most complicit, alongside a subservient State. The report shows how easy it was to sacrifice women and children to narrow, ludicrous notions of sexual morality. All the Christian churches are implicated in the report but the Catholic Church imposed a culture of fear among uneducated people. It told them emphatically that, through baptism, they were obliged to obey the teaching of their church and remain members of that church for life. So from day one, their right to information was curtailed as well as their freedom of opinion - they had to be obedient to the bishops."  McAleese said the Church's teaching remains unchanged. "The difference is we are more educated now and we can argue back. People know their rights and they know they can walk away from the Church."  Regarding the apologies from religious orders, she said "There was an attempt at honesty and acceptance of responsibility from them."

Catherine Corless
Catherine Corless, whose work led to the setting up of the Commission, said that she was disappointed with aspects of the report, saying it was "vague" about illegal adoption: "There’s a lot of people disappointed it wasn’t gone into in a little more detail in the report. I’ve said it over and over again, they need an acknowledgement from the people that hurt them and put them in this situation. That’s first and foremost, and that hasn’t come out as yet."  She called for actions to back up the state apology, saying "An apology is words written out for the Taoiseach today. What the survivors need is an immediate follow up to all those promises and all those recommendations that the Commissioner of Investigation have done. So there’s an awful lot of preparing to do to ensure that those people are treated as good as the rest of us."

Survivors
Representative organisations, who were not given copies of the report before publication, have been slow to publicly comment, as they work through the contents. Individuals, including those who testified before the Commission, have been critical of some findings, especially the findings that there was little evidence of forced adoption, compulsory work in the mother and baby homes, or mistreatment of girls and women and their children, given that such testimony is contained within the report.

The Tuam Survivors Network said "The Taoiseach has said this, that we did this to ourselves, but in reality we didn't because the Church and the State, it was run by men, there was no semblance of understanding or compassion."

The Coalition of Mother And Baby Home Survivors described the report as incomplete, saying there is "strong evidence of physical and emotional abuse" and that "women were made to scrub floors and stairs and treated as slave labour and were also treated appallingly while in childbirth by denial of doctors, medical equipment and painkilling drugs. It is clear from the report that the mothers and children in the homes suffered gross breaches of their human rights; in fact what occurred was downright criminal."

The Irish First Mothers Groups said "The official inquiry into mother and baby homes has absolved both the Church and State of any systemic responsibility for what it admits is the effective incarceration of pregnant mothers."

Irish Traveller survivor Mary Teresa Collins, who was interviewed by the Commission, said the state apology is meaningless to her and other survivors.

Criticisms in the aftermath of the final report
The Commission was criticised by survivors and Oireachtas members for twice refusing to appear before the Oireachtas Children's Committee in order to give a briefing and answer questions on the final report.  This criticism was revisited and repeated in June 2021, when it emerged that members of the Commission were presenting at an academic seminar in Oxford University, on the work of the Commission. 

Many survivors criticised the report, in particular for concluding that there was a lack of evidence of forced adoption and abuse, despite testimonies contradicting this, and it was confirmed that the Investigative Committee was given more weight than testimony presented to the Confidential Committee. Some survivors said that their testimonies were amended or misrepresented.  Later in June, the former Commission members again refused to appear before the Children's Committee, provoking further criticism from survivors and committee members.  Some survivors and members of Oireachtas called on the Minister to repudiate the report.  Catherine Corless described the Commission's response "an eye-opener" and said the process of gathering and recording witness testimony had turned out to be a "complete waste of survivors' time."

Following publication of the final report, survivors sought access to their own records by making Subject Access Requests (SARs) to the Department of Health. This resulted in forms used by the Commission to compile their report from witness testimony being shown to be unfit for purpose, according to survivors and their families. The daughter of one survivor said that it was "incomprehensible that options such as rape, incest, extra-marital and casual encounter are included under 'current relationship status' without anyone saying this is an issue. Also, it shows they never expected this to get into the public domain. In what world is rape or incest a relationship status?"

Some of those who received access to their records claim that material on their file was forged. For example, one survivor was given a letter from her file, in June 2021, that was purportedly written by her, thanking Ard Mhuire Mother and Baby Home for their help. She denies ever writing such a letter, and points out phrasing in the letter she would never have used.

In July 2021, it was announced that two test judicial review cases were being taken by Mother and Baby Home survivors Philomena Lee and Mary Harney. Their cases seek to quash elements of the Commission's final report, with Lee's court submission stating "numerous findings of the Commission in its final report which are at odds with the testimony of [Lee] provided on affidavit to the Commission." The Commission did not provide Lee with a draft or extract, as required by section 34 of the Commissions of Investigation Act 2004. A third case taken by Mari Steed seeks to quash that part of the Commission's finding that there was no evidence any child was harmed by vaccine trials carried out at the institutions. The cases are due to be heard in late 2021.

Alternative report
In the aftermath of the publication of the Commission's final report, ongoing media commentary focused on the discrepancies between the findings in the report's executive summary and actual witness testimony that directly contradicts those findings.

The discrepancies led to calls for the report to be repudiated by the government. One such call was made by Caitríona Crowe, former head of special projects at the National Archives of Ireland, who said "[The report's] conclusions are disputed, not just by survivors, but by many commentators who do not share the commission’s view that Church and State were not the primary movers and operators of this vast system of incarceration and family separation. The repudiation of these findings would not be seen by most as a loss; on the contrary, many survivors view their rejection, as the State’s official view of what happened to them, to be essential."

In July 2021, a group of 25 researchers and academics announced that over the months since the publication of the original report, they had established a project to explore whether the Commission could have come to different findings, using the evidence available to it. They concluded that the Commission had sufficient evidence before it to find multiple abuses of key human rights provisions. Their "alternative report" was published on 15 July 2021.

See also
 Ferns Report
 Industrial school
 Magdalene asylum
 Murphy Report
 St Joseph's Industrial School, Letterfrack

References

Further reading
 
 
 Commission to Inquire into Child Abuse: Interim Reports and Final Report (2009)
 Report of the Inter-Departmental Committee to establish the facts of State involvement with the Magdalen Laundries (2013)
 Report on three clinical trials involving children and babies in institutional settings 1960/61, 1970 and 1973: Chief Medical Officer (1997)
 Report of Dr Deirdre Madden on Post Mortem Practice and Procedures: (2005)
 Second Interim Report of the Mother and Baby Homes Commission (September 2016)

External links 
 Mother and baby Homes Commission of Investigation
 Department of Children and Youth Affairs home page on issues relating to Mother and Baby Homes
 Technical Report on the Tuam Site Stage 2: Options and Appropriate Courses of Action available to Government at the site of the former Mother and Baby Home, Tuam, Co. Galway
 Final Report of the Mother and Baby Homes Commission of Investigation

2015 establishments in Ireland
2021 disestablishments in Ireland
Burials in the Republic of Ireland
Child abuse in the Republic of Ireland
History of Catholicism in Ireland
Society of Ireland
Mass graves
Mother and baby homes in Ireland
Poor law infirmaries
Public inquiries in Ireland
Scandals in the Republic of Ireland